Michael Crafter is an Australian musician, singer-songwriter and entertainment manager. His music career began as lead vocalist for I Killed the Prom Queen. He is the vocalist of Confession, and former vocalist of Carpathian, xAll It Cost Was Everythingx and Bury Your Dead. Crafter sometimes runs a clothing apparel business called Mistake and printing business.

Biography

Crafter is a vocalist and music manager in the Australian metalcore scene and lives a straight edge lifestyle. Crafter made a brief appearance on Big Brother Australia after being voted in by the public through an online voting process via the Big Brother website. He was evicted after three days, claiming his eviction was planned (due to the I Killed the Prom Queen's "Say Goodbye Tour"). Crafter has publicly stated that he has made plans to appear on Big Brother in the next season, wishing only to remain in the household. He also appeared in the 2009 documentary Parkway Drive: The DVD, providing commentary on the metal band Parkway Drive. He provides background on the band and explains about their beginnings in Byron Bay. In addition to this, during the live set Crafter performs a stage dive during the closing breakdown to "Boneyards", the set's opening track. Crafter has since ceased his musical ventures to move onto various business ventures in Perth, Western Australia.

Music career

I Killed The Prom Queen (2000–2006, 2008)
Crafter was the vocalist for I Killed The Prom Queen from 2000 to 2006, he then reformed with I Killed The Prom Queen after the breakup in 2008 to do, the apparent, last Australian tour. He has featured on all of the band's discography. The Australian Tour edition of the album titled 'Music For the Recently Deceased' features vocals recorded by Crafter, with the 2008 release featuring his vocal versions of the songs 'Sharks in Your Mouth', 'Say Goodbye', '€666' and 'Like Nails to a Casket'. The 2011 re-release contained a disc featuring all 11 tracks with his vocals.

Carpathian (2006)
Crafter joined Carpathian shortly after the release of their debut album, Nothing to Lose, in 2006. After seven months, Michael parted ways with them in February 2007. Despite popular belief, he never performed on any of their recordings in this time.

Bury Your Dead (2007)
In early 2007, he was recruited as vocalist for the American band, Bury Your Dead, but "decided" to leave mid-tour in May 2007 due to "homesicknesss".

Confession (2008–2016)
Crafter is currently the vocalist for the band, Confession, whose members are from Brisbane, Melbourne, Adelaide and Byron Bay, New South Wales Australia. Confession was formed by Crafter in 2008.

In 2008, Confession released an EP on Resist Records entitled Can't Live, Can't Breathe and in 2009 released the album "Cancer", which earned the Australian Album of the Year Award. Their latest release, the album The Long Way Home, was released in late 2011.

Kevin Cameron, previously a member of I Killed The Prom Queen, replaced Tyrone, temporary. After Kevin Cameron's short stint with Confession, Dan Brown went back to playing guitar in the band and made way for Jamie Hope of The Red Shore to fill in on bass for the "Keeping it Bogan" tour before Byron Carney of 50 Lions was announced as the new bass player. However, Byron's stay with Confession was short lived and Dan went back to bass for a while and Confession played as a four-piece until they recruited former bassist of The Red Shore, Tim Anderson.

The recent Long Way Home tour was relatively successful, and showcased Confession's new lineup.

In 2014, Confession released a new album called "Life and Death" which featured a couple of well – known artists from the band The Amity Affliction, Joel Birch, the frontman and also Ahern Stringer the bassist. The album saw a new turn of events when Crafter restarted the band after an altercation with a few unloyal band mates.

In 2016, Confession announced their breakup, and held a breakup tour that went right around the country. Michael Crafter mentioned that he wanted to explore different avenues with businesses.

Discography
I Killed the Prom Queen 
2002 – Choose to Love, Live or Die
2003 – I Killed The Prom Queen/Parkway Drive: Split CD
2003 – When Goodbye Means Forever...
2005 – Your Past Comes Back to Haunt You
2008 – Music for the Recently Deceased: Australian Tour Edition
2008 – Sleepless Nights and City Lights (CD/DVD)

Confession
2008 – Can't Live, Can't Breathe
2009 – Cancer
2011 – The Long Way Home
2014 – Life and Death

References

External links
 Michael Crafter the band on Bandcamp

Living people
Australian bass guitarists
Australian male singers
Big Brother (Australian TV series) contestants
Australian heavy metal singers
Male bass guitarists
Year of birth missing (living people)
Australian male guitarists
Bury Your Dead members
I Killed the Prom Queen members